Conservative Dentistry, also known as operative dentistry or crown and bridge dentistry, is the area of dentistry that focuses on dental crowns and bridges.

Treatment modalities 

 Bridge
 Crown
 Veneer
 Fixed prosthodontics
 Inlays and onlays

See also 

American College of Prosthodontists
 British Society for Restorative Dentistry
 Commonly used terms of relationship and comparison in dentistry
 Craniofacial prosthesis
 Dental fear
 Dental restoration
 Dental braces
 Mandibular advancement splint
 Oral and maxillofacial surgery
 Dental implant
 European Journal of Prosthodontics and Restorative Dentistry

References 

Prosthodontology